The 2000 WGC-Andersen Consulting Match Play Championship was a golf tournament that was played from February 23–27, 2000 at La Costa Resort and Spa in Carlsbad, California. It was the second WGC-Andersen Consulting Match Play Championship and the first of four World Golf Championships events held in 2000.

Darren Clarke won his first World Golf Championships event at the match-play, by defeating Tiger Woods 4 & 3 in the 36 hole final.

Brackets
The Championship was a single elimination match play event. The field consisted of the top 64 players available from the Official World Golf Ranking as of the February 13 ranking, seeded according to those rankings. 

For the second successive year Jumbo Osaki (ranked #36) chose not to play. He was replaced by Michael Campbell (#65).

Bobby Jones bracket

Ben Hogan bracket

Gary Player bracket

Sam Snead bracket

Final Four

Breakdown by country

Prize money breakdown

References

External links
 Bracket PDF

WGC Match Play
Golf in California
Carlsbad, California
Sports competitions in San Diego County, California
WGC-Andersen Consulting Match Play Championship
WGC-Andersen Consulting Match Play Championship
WGC-Andersen Consulting Match Play Championship
WGC-Andersen Consulting Match Play Championship